Archaeodictyna ammophila is a spider species found in Europe to Central Asia.

See also 
 List of Dictynidae species

References

External links 

Dictynidae
Spiders of Asia
Spiders described in 1871
Spiders of Europe